Lord Carr may refer to:
Charles Kerr, 2nd Earl of Ancram (1624–1690), Scottish peer and English Member of Parliament, known as Lord Carr before he succeeded to the earldom in 1654
Robert Carr, Baron Carr of Hadley (1916–2012), British Conservative politician